Ashley Robertson (born 9 March 1972) is an Australian former cricketer. He played two first-class cricket matches for Victoria between 1998 and 1999.

See also
 List of Victoria first-class cricketers

References

External links
 

1972 births
Living people
Australian cricketers
Victoria cricketers
Cricketers from Melbourne